Nikolaos Zafeiriou (1871 – 1947) was a Greek artillery officer who rose to the rank of Lieutenant General.

Zafeiriou was born in Corinth in 1871. After studies in the Hellenic Military Academy, he was commissioned as an Artillery 2nd Lieutenant in 1894. He fought in the Greco-Turkish War of 1897. At the outbreak of the First Balkan War he served in the staff of the Army of Epirus and later the 8th Infantry Division which was formed of it. After the Balkan Wars he attended the École Militaire in Paris.

In 1916 he joined the Provisional Government of National Defence and commanded the 1st Regiment of the Serres Division on the Macedonian Front. In May 1919, as commander of the 1st Infantry Division, he led the Greek landing at Smyrna and became the first head of the Army of Asia Minor. In 1923, he served as Deputy Chief of the General Staff, while in 1924 he was promoted to Major General and commander of the 3rd Infantry Division. Subsequently promoted further to Lieutenant General, he served consecutively as commander of the II, III and V Army Corps until his retirement in 1926. 

He died in Athens in 1947.

References 

1871 births
1947 deaths
Hellenic Army lieutenant generals
Greek military personnel of the Balkan Wars
Greek military personnel of the Greco-Turkish War (1897)
Greek military personnel of the Greco-Turkish War (1919–1922)
Greek military personnel of World War I
People from Corinth